Yosif Isaakovich Gotman (1890–1920), also known by his nom de plure Yosif the Emigrant, was a Ukrainian anarchist and a leading member of the Nabat and the Makhnovshchina.

Biography
Yosif was born into a Ukrainian Jewish family. Following the suppression of the 1905 Revolution, he emigrated to the United States, where he became involved in the activities of the Union of Russian Workers. With the outbreak of the 1917 Revolution, Gotman returned to Ukraine, joining the resurgent anarcho-syndicalist movement in Odesa as a labor organizer. Following the invasion of Ukraine by the Central Powers, he participated in the insurgency against the Ukrainian State.

Following the ousting of the occupation forces in November 1918, he participated in the establishment of a Ukrainian Anarchist Confederation known as the Nabat and became one of its leading members in the secretariat in Kharkiv. He quickly became known by his nom de plure "The Emigrant", due to his years spent in the Americas. In March 1919, he began forming links between the Nabat and the Makhnovist movement, although he was initially skeptical about its activities. 

Following the repression of the Nabat by the Bolsheviks in August 1919, Gotman and Volin fled Kharkiv and joined the Makhnovshchina, immediately involving themselves in the movement's propaganda activities. Gotman himself joined the Makhnovshchina's cultural section and acted as a teacher for the insurgents at camp. They both became close friends of Nestor Makhno himself, which led them to join the Military Revolutionary Council, the Makhnovist movement's executive organ. In January 1920, Gotman was arrested by the Cheka in Oleksandrivsk on charges of anti-Soviet agitation, but was later released under the terms of the Starobilsk agreement.

In August 1920 Gotman was visited by Alexander Berkman at his bookshop, the Volnoe Bratstvo (Free Brotherhood) in Kharkiv. He told Berkman of his dislike for the Bolsheviks and his admiration of the Makhnovshchina, which he claimed to represent "the real spirit of October". In September 1920, at a clandestine conference of the Nabat held in Kharkiv, Yosif opposed an anti-Makhnovist resolution issued by Aron Baron. Yosif attempted to reach Makhno to recover the relationship between the Nabat and the Makhnovshchina. But on 26 November, the Bolsheviks initiated a campaign of political repression against the Ukrainian anarchists, arresting and imprisoning the Nabat's leading members. While on his way to the insurgent headquarters, Gotman was arrested and executed by the Cheka.

References

Bibliography

Further reading

1890 births
1920 deaths
20th-century Ukrainian educators
20th-century Ukrainian Jews
20th-century Ukrainian writers
American people of Ukrainian-Jewish descent
Anarcho-syndicalists
Emigrants from the Russian Empire to the United States
Jewish anarchists
Jewish trade unionists
Jewish Ukrainian politicians
Makhnovshchina
Odesa Jews
People of the 1905 Russian Revolution
Ukrainian anarchists
Ukrainian male writers
Ukrainian people executed by the Soviet Union
Ukrainian people of the Ukrainian–Soviet War
Ukrainian trade unionists
Executed anarchists